Dr. Mohammad Marwan Arafat (5 January 1945 – 12 June 2012) was a Syrian football referee, sports analyst, academic lecturer and journalist, well known for being the first Arabic and Asian football referee to be a linesman in a 3rd place Olympic game match (Moscow 1980). He was the head of the Syrian football association three times. During his presidency of the Syrian FA, the Syrian U-21 team won the Asian cup in 1994 in Indonesia.

Early life
Marwan Arafat was born in the district of Rukn ad-Deen in Damascus, where he finished his primary and secondary school studies.  He continued his studies in Geography department of the Damascus University. He received his diploma and Master's degree in Education from the Damascus University. Later on, he received his Ph.D. in Physical education from the United States.

Later life
Arafat was married to Afaf Al-Hibri and had four children: Waheed (a lawyer), Hanadi (a Sport teacher and special Olympics trainer), Waseem (a Urologist in Germany) and Waddah (Internal Medicine physician at Indiana University in the United States).  Arafat was an active journalist, renowned lecturer in Asian football and one of the prominent sports figure in Syrian football and media. He was a lecturer in Damascus University from 1978 until his death in 2012.

Death
According to the Syrian government sources, on 12 June 2012, Arafat was assassinated by unknown armed militants on the Daraa-Damascus road, while his wife was severely injured.

References

2012 deaths
1945 births
Sportspeople from Damascus
Olympic football referees
Football referees at the 1980 Summer Olympics
Syrian football referees
People murdered in Syria
Assassinated Syrian people
Male murder victims
Deaths by firearm in Syria